The 2010 CEMAC Cup was the seventh edition of the CEMAC Cup, the football championship of Central African nations.

The tournament was held in capital city Brazzaville of Republic of the Congo from September 24 to October 3. All matches were played in Stade Alphonse Massemba-Débat.

It was played by 6 teams composed just by players based on local clubs. However, Equatorial Guinea included in their squad to four players who were active in Spanish clubs – Spanish-born Cape Verdean Deivis de Jesus Soares and Equatoguineans Bonifacio Ondo Andeme, Benjamín Sima Obiang and Jaime Chochi Rieba.

Group stage

Group A

Group B

Knockout stage

Semi-final

Third-place match

Final

Individual scorers
3 goals
 Hilaire Momi
 Ezechiel Ndouassel

2 goals
 Philippe Ebonde Ebongue
 Ahmed Evariste Medego

1 goal
 Geremi Sagong
 Amorese Dertin
 Karl Max Dany
 Jusly Gitel Boukama-Kaya
 Freddy De Buisson
 Loris Nkolo
 Rochel Osséré
 Harris Tchilimbou

Own goals
 Loris Nkolo (for Cameroon)

References

External links
Official website
RSSSF archives

CEMAC Cup
Cem
2010 in African football
CEMAC